V Star or V-star may refer to:

Businesses
VStar Entertainment Group, an American family entertainment production company 
V Star Multimedia, division of Virgin Megastores
V-Star Creations, an Indian clothing manufacturer

Science and technology
 Vstar, a subsatellite of SELENE Japanese lunar orbiter spacecraft 
 Star of luminosity class V, a Stellar classification

Transport
 Star Motorcycles V star models
 Stolp SA-900 V-Star, an American aerobatic homebuilt biplane

See also
 Five star (disambiguation)